Ramparts of Brabant (Dutch:De omwalling van Brabant, French:Rempart du Brabant) is a 1921 Belgian silent film directed by Théo Bergerat.

References

Bibliography
 Philippe Rège. Encyclopedia of French Film Directors, Volume 1. Scarecrow Press, 2009.

External links 
 

1921 films
1920s French-language films
1920s Dutch-language films
Films directed by Théo Bergerat
Films set in Belgium
Belgian black-and-white films
1920s multilingual films
Belgian multilingual films
French-language Belgian films